Mohammad Naeem (born 24 April 1959) is a former Pakistani cricketer. From Lahore, Mohammad made his first-class debut during the 1977–78 season, playing three matches for the Income Tax Department in the Patron's Trophy. He did not again play at first-class level until several seasons later, playing five matches for Lahore City during the 1982–83 season of the Quaid-e-Azam Trophy. A wicket-keeper, Mohammad usually batted in the lower order, but occasionally opened the batting, with his highest score (and only half-century) an innings of 51 runs against United Bank Limited as an opener. Although he did not play any further matches at first-class level, he did go on to play two List A matches for Lahore City—one each during the 1982–83 and 1985–86 seasons of the limited-overs Wills Cup.

References

1959 births
Income Tax Department cricketers
Lahore City cricketers
Living people
Pakistani cricketers
Cricketers from Lahore
Wicket-keepers